Saintes Cathedral (Cathédrale Saint-Pierre de Saintes) is a former Catholic church located in Saintes, France. The cathedral is a national monument.

It was formerly the seat of the Bishop of Saintes, a diocese abolished under the Concordat of 1801, when its territory was reallocated, mostly to the Diocese of La Rochelle.

The previous cathedral was built here in the 12th century. Little remains of this building apart from a Romanesque arm and the crossing of the transept. The cloisters date from the 13th century. Otherwise the church was entirely rebuilt starting from 1450, in the Flamboyant style, and work was still not completed in 1568, when during the French Wars of Religion, from which this region suffered particularly severely, the building was sacked by Protestants, causing such serious damage that the nave had afterwards to be entirely rebuilt.

Lack of resources meant that a complete rebuilding has never been possible. The heavy appearance of the tower, for example, results from the lack of the spire intended to finish it, the present dome constituting a more economical substitute.

The interior is made striking by its lack of decoration and by the wooden ceiling, completed in 1927.

Pictures

Sources

 
  Architecture religieuse en Occident: Saint Pierre de Saintes
 Ministry of Culture: Archive images of Saintes Cathedral
 Bernezac.com: Cathédrale Saint-Pierre de Saintes 

Former cathedrals in France
Basilica churches in France
Churches in Charente-Maritime
Saintes, Charente-Maritime